Mersin İdmanyurdu (also Mersin İdman Yurdu, Mersin İY, or MİY) Sports Club; located in Mersin, east Mediterranean coast of Turkey in 1975–76. At the end of 1975–76 season Mersin İdmanyurdu promoted to First League after two seasons since its relegated from the league in 1973–74 season. It was the second promotion of the team. The 1974–75 season was the sixth season of Mersin İdmanyurdu (MİY) football team in Turkish Second Football League, the second level division in Turkey. They finished 1st in the Red Group.

The president of the club was Kaya Mutlu, mayor of the Mersin city. General captain was Burhan Kanun. Club director was Kazım Tunç.

The manager of the team was Kadri Aytaç, former player of Galatasaray and Mersin İdmanyurdu. They have lost second league championship game against Samsunspor.

Pre-season
The team attended Spor-Toto Cup organized between 02.08.1975 and 30.08.1975 in 7th group together with Adanaspor, Hatayspor, İskenderunspor and Konya İdmanyurdu.
 30.08.1975 - MİY-Syria Amateur national football team.

1975–76 Second League participation
In its 13th season (1975–76) Second League was played with 32 teams, 16 in red group and 16 in white group. First teams promoted to First League 1976–77 and last teams relegated to Third League 1976–77 in each group. Mersin İY became 1st with 14 wins and 39 goals in Red Group. Şeref Başoğlu was the most scorer player with 9 goals.

Results summary
Mersin İdmanyurdu (MİY) 1975–76 Second League Red Group league summary:

Sources: 1975–76 Turkish Second Football League pages.

League table
Mersin İY's league performance in Second League Red Group in 1975–76 season is shown in the following table.

Note: Won, drawn and lost points are 2, 1 and 0. F belongs to MİY and A belongs to corresponding team for both home and away matches.

Results by round
Results of games MİY played in 1975–76 Second League Red Group by rounds:

First half

Second half

Championship match
Mersin İdmanyurdu lost the second league championship game against Samsunspor, the White Group's winner.

1975–76 Turkish Cup participation
1975–76 Turkish Cup was played for the 14th season as Türkiye Kupası by 88 teams. First and second elimination rounds were played in one-leg elimination system. Third and fourth elimination rounds and finals were played in two-legs elimination system. Mersin İdmanyurdu participated in 1975–76  Turkish Cup from round 2 and eliminated at round 4 by Ankaragücü. Ankaragücü was eliminated by Galatasaray at semifinals. Galatasaray won the Cup for the 6th time and became eligible for 1976–77 ECW Cup.

Cup track
The drawings and results Mersin İdmanyurdu (MİY) followed in 1975–76 Turkish Cup are shown in the following table.

Note: In the above table 'Score' shows For and Against goals whether the match played at home or not.

Game details
Mersin İdmanyurdu (MİY) 1975–76 Turkish Cup game reports is shown in the following table.
Kick off times are in EET and EEST.

Source: 1975–76 Turkish Cup pages.

Management

Club management
Kaya Mutlu was club president. Burhan Kanun was general captain.

Coaching team

1975–76 Mersin İdmanyurdu head coaches:

Note: Only official games were included.

1975–76 squad
Stats are counted for 1975–76 Second League matches and  1975–76 Turkish Cup (Türkiye Kupası) matches. In the team rosters five substitutes were allowed to appear, two of whom were substitutable. Only the players who appeared in game rosters were included and listed in the order of appearance.

Sources: 1975–76 season squad data from maçkolik com, Milliyet, and Cem Pekin Archives.

News from Milliyet:
 Transfers in: Aydın (Ankaragücü); Rüçhan (Fenerbahçe).
 Transfers out: Nevruz went to Fenerbahçe in exchange for Rüçhan and some money.
 General Captain Burhan Kanun has started an aid campaign for former player Cihat Erbil who was cancered. Mersin İdmanyurdu players also collected an amount. Some firms, citizens and sportsmen including those of neighbour teams Adanaspor and Adana Demirspor contributed too. Cihat had been transferred from Bandırmaspor in 1969.

See also
 Football in Turkey
 1975–76 Turkish First Football League
 1975–76 Turkish Cup

Notes and references

Mersin İdman Yurdu seasons
Turkish football clubs 1975–76 season